Bill Kuster (May 9, 1930 – August 12, 2006) was an American television meteorologist. He was a weather forecaster at KYW-TV in Philadelphia from 1963 to 1979 and KUSA in Denver from 1979 to 1996.

Biography

Early life and education
William E. Kuster was born on May 9, 1930 in Fernville, Pennsylvania. The Kuster family later moved to Bloomsburg, Pennsylvania, where he briefly attended Bloomsburg State College. He served for four years in the U.S. Navy during the Korean War before earning a bachelor's degree in journalism in 1956 from Pennsylvania State University.

Career
Bill Kuster's broadcast career began with a six-month period at WARM (AM) in Scranton as a substitute game show host and weatherman. He next worked at WGAL in Lancaster as a weatherman and assistant news director.

In 1963, he moved to the Philadelphia area and joined KYW-TV as a weekend weatherman. He started a vegetable garden, dubbed Kuster's Garden, at the station in 1975.

After he left KYW in 1979, he moved to Denver, Colorado station KUSA-TV. He worked as KUSA's weekday and weekend weathercaster until his retirement in 1996. He continued the tradition of his Kuster Garden in Denver and expanded it to enlist a restaurateur to prepare meals with the annual harvest for Denver-area homeless shelters.

Marriage and children
Bill married the former Dottie Zettle circa 1955. The couple had two children, son Marc and daughter Kim.

Death and afterward
Kuster died on August 12, 2006 following a battle with leukemia.

The Broadcast Pioneers of Philadelphia inducted Kuster posthumously into their Hall of Fame in 2008.

References

External links
The Broadcast Pioneers of Philadelphia: Bill Kuster

1930 births
2006 deaths
American television meteorologists
Bloomsburg University of Pennsylvania alumni
Deaths from leukemia
Donald P. Bellisario College of Communications alumni
Deaths from cancer in Colorado